The Music Master is a Canadian drama film, directed by Fedor Ozep and released in 1945. The first full-length feature film ever produced by a commercial studio in Quebec and the first film in Canada's post-World War II "boom" in filmmaking, the film's main characters are estranged brothers Paul (Marcel Chabrier) and Pierre (Pierre Durand) Dupont, who emigrated to Quebec from France in their youth; Paul has grown up to be a church organist, of modest means but beloved by his family and community, while Pierre has become a wealthy businessman, but is unmarried and isolated. The film's plot centres on their reunion for the first time since going their separate ways to pursue their different dreams.

The cast also includes Madeleine Ozeray, Janine Sutto, Guy Mauffette, Pierre Dagenais, François Rozet, Ginette Letondal, Albert Duquesne, Ovila Légaré, Louis Rolland, J. Léo Gagnon, Paul Guèvremont, Jeanne Maubourg, Fannie Tremblay, Lise Roy, Jean Lajeunesse, Conrad Gauthier and Roland D'Amour.

The film premiered on April 14, 1945 at the Théâtre Saint-Denis in Montreal. Although well-received, the film did face some minor criticism for the fact that its dialogue was spoken in a Continental French rather than a Quebec French accent.

 purchased Renaissance Films following the success of the film.

Production 
The film had a budget of $250,000.

References

Works cited

External links 
 

1945 films
1940s French-language films
French-language Canadian films
Films directed by Fedor Ozep
Films set in Quebec
Films shot in Quebec
Canadian black-and-white films
Canadian drama films
1945 drama films
1940s Canadian films
Quebec films